The name Bebinca has been used to name four tropical cyclones in the northwestern Pacific Ocean. The name was submitted by Macau and refers to a kind of milk pudding popular there.
 Severe Tropical Storm Bebinca (2000) (T0021, 31W, Seniang), hit the central Philippines; killed 26
 Severe Tropical Storm Bebinca (2006) (T0616, 19W, Neneng), swept across the Honshū coastal waters; 33 people dead or missing
 Tropical Storm Bebinca (2013) (T1305, 05W, Fabian)
 Tropical Storm Bebinca (2018) (T1816, 20W)

Pacific typhoon set index articles